Steve Cauthen (born May 1, 1960) is a retired American jockey.

In 1977 he became the first jockey to win over $6 million in a year working with agent Lenny Goodman, and in 1978 he became the youngest jockey to win the U. S. Triple Crown. Cauthen is the only jockey ever named Sports Illustrated Sportsman of the Year.

After riding for a few years in the United States, he began racing in Europe. He is the only jockey to have won both the Kentucky Derby and the Epsom Derby.

Background
Cauthen, the son of a trainer and a farrier, grew up in Walton, Kentucky around horses, which (along with his small size) made race-riding a logical career choice.

Racing career

North America
He rode his first race on May 12, 1976 at Churchill Downs at age 16; he finished last, riding King of Swat. He rode his first winner (Red Pipe) less than a week later, at River Downs.

He was the nation's leader in race wins in 1977 with 487.  In only his second year of riding, he became the first jockey to win $6 million in a single season, passing that mark in December 1977.

In 1978 he became the youngest jockey to ever win the U. S. Triple Crown, riding Affirmed, and he was named Sports Illustrated Sportsman of the Year.

He had increasing problems making the weight and moved to the UK, where jockey weights were higher.

Europe
A June 16, 1985 feature story in the New York Times titled "Cauthen's Success Amazes Britain" said "Cauthen was lured to Britain by Robert Sangster." Quoting The Guardian newspaper's Richard Baerlein, a respected racing correspondent for more than 50 years in England, as saying that "He's matured into the perfect jockey." The Times story also reported that "Henry Cecil signed Cauthen to replace Piggott as the main jockey for his powerful stable."

In his first race in the UK in April 1979 Cauthen rode Marquee Universal to victory at Salisbury.

Steve Cauthen was British Champion Jockey three times, and won English classic races ten times, including the 2,000 Guineas, the Derby twice, and the St Leger three times. In 1985 he won three Classics riding Oh So Sharp. In 1989 he rode European Horse of the Year Old Vic to victory in the French Derby and the Irish Derby. In 1991 he won the Italian Derby on Hailsham.

Retirement
After he finished his riding career, Cauthen returned to Kentucky and bought a stud farm. He participated in Prince Edward of the United Kingdom's 1987 charity television special The Grand Knockout Tournament.

In 1999, the Racing Post ranked Cauthen as eighth in their list of the Top 50 jockeys of the 20th century.

Cauthen and his wife, Amy have three daughters.

Major winners
 Great Britain
 1,000 Guineas - Oh So Sharp (1985)
 2,000 Guineas - Tap on Wood (1979)
 Derby - Slip Anchor (1985), Reference Point (1987)
 King George VI and Queen Elizabeth Stakes  - Reference Point (1987)
 Oaks - Oh So Sharp (1985), Diminuendo (1988), Snow Bride (1989)
 St. Leger - Oh So Sharp (1985), Reference Point (1987), Michelozzo (1989)

 France
 Grand Prix de Paris - Risk Me (1987), Saumarez (1990)
 French Derby  - Old Vic (1989)

 Ireland
 Irish 1,000 Guineas - In the Groove (1990)
 Irish Derby - Old Vic (1989)
 Irish Oaks  - Diminuendo (dead heat 1988), Possessive Dancer (1991)
 Irish St. Leger - Mashaallah (1992)

 Italy
 Derby Italiano -  Hailsham (1991)
 Gran Criterium - Tanque Verde (1985)

 United States
 Kentucky Derby - Affirmed (1978)
 Preakness Stakes - Affirmed (1978)
 Belmont Stakes - Affirmed (1978)

References

American jockeys
British jockeys
Eclipse Award winners
American Champion jockeys
United States Thoroughbred Racing Hall of Fame inductees

Sportspeople from Covington, Kentucky
People from Walton, Kentucky
1960 births
Living people
American sports announcers
American horse racing announcers
British Champion flat jockeys
Sportspeople from the Cincinnati metropolitan area